The enzyme ureidoglycolate lyase (EC 4.3.2.3) catalyzes the chemical reaction

(S)-ureidoglycolate  glyoxylate + urea

This enzyme belongs to the family of lyases, specifically amidine lyases.  The systematic name of this enzyme class is (S)-ureidoglycolate urea-lyase (glyoxylate-forming). Other names in common use include ureidoglycolatase, ureidoglycolase, ureidoglycolate hydrolase, and (S)-ureidoglycolate urea-lyase.  This enzyme participates in purine metabolism.

References

 

EC 4.3.2
Enzymes of unknown structure